Rami Al-Mutairi (born 25 October 1995) is a Qatari handball player for Al-Arabi and the Saudi Arabian national team.

He represented Saudi Arabia at the 2019 World Men's Handball Championship.

References

1995 births
Living people
Saudi Arabian male handball players
Handball players at the 2014 Asian Games
Asian Games competitors for Saudi Arabia
21st-century Saudi Arabian people
20th-century Saudi Arabian people